This is a list of films produced in Taiwan ordered by year of release. For an alphabetical list of Taiwanese films see :Category:Taiwanese films

1922

1925

1965

1966

References

External links
 Taiwanese film at the Internet Movie Database

1920s
1920s in Taiwan
Taiwan
1930s
1930s in Taiwan
Taiwan
1940s
1940s in Taiwan
Taiwan
1950s
1950s in Taiwan
Taiwan
1960s
1960s in Taiwan
Taiwan